The Bolam Glacier is a glacier situated on the northern flank of Mount Shasta, in the U.S. state of California. It is the second longest glacier in California behind the nearby Whitney Glacier, and the fourth largest and most voluminous after the neighboring Hotlum Glacier, Whitney Glacier, and Wintun Glacier. The glacier flows north down a steep slope and terminates near . It has a contributing drainage area of 1.03 km2.

In 2002, scientists made the first detailed survey of Mount Shasta's glaciers in 50 years. They found that seven of the glaciers have grown over the period 1951–2002, with the Hotlum and Wintun nearly doubling, the Bolam increasing by half, and the Whitney and Konwakiton Glaciers growing by a third. Due to rising global temperatures, as of 2007, alpine glaciers and rock glaciers are shrinking across the western United States.

See also
List of glaciers in the United States

References

Glaciers of Siskiyou County, California
Glaciers of California
Glaciers of Mount Shasta